HMS St George, sometimes written as HMS George, was a 42-gun great ship of the English Royal Navy, built by Andrew Burrell at Deptford and launched in 1622. By 1660 her armament had been increased to 56 guns. It finally increased to 60 guns.
St George was hulked in 1687, and sunk as a blockship at Sheerness in 1697.

Notes

Three decks lists William Burrell as the builder/designer

References

Lavery, Brian (2003) The Ship of the Line - Volume 1: The development of the battlefleet 1650–1850. Conway Maritime Press. .

Three Decks <https://threedecks.org/index.php?display_type=show_ship&id=57>

Ships of the line of the Royal Navy
Ships built in Deptford
1620s ships